The 2022 ESPY Awards was the 30th annual ceremony of the ESPY Award, held on July 20, 2022, at the Dolby Theatre in Los Angeles, and broadcast on ABC. NBA player Stephen Curry served as the host.

Winners and nominees

Honorary awards
Jimmy V Award
Dick Vitale

Arthur Ashe Courage Award
Vitali Klitschko

Muhammad Ali Sports Humanitarian Award
Albert Pujols

Pat Tillman Award for Service
Gretchen Evans

Sports Humanitarian Team of the Year
Denver Broncos

Tribute
In order to celebrate the 50th anniversary of Title IX going into effect, country music singer Mickey Guyton performed "What Are You Gonna Tell Her?" and "Remember Her Name" interspersed with short speeches from female athletes including Billie Jean King, Lisa Leslie, Brandi Chastain, Carolyn Peck, Jocelyn Alo, Layshia Clarendon, Chloe Kim, Oksana Masters, Allyson Felix, Aly Raisman and Megan Rapinoe discussing the progress that still has to be made for women in sports.

References

External links
 ESPN: Serving sports fans. Anytime. Anywhere. – ESPN

2022
ESPY
ESPY
ESPY
ESPY Awards